"Goodbye in Her Eyes" is a song recorded by American country music group Zac Brown Band. It was released in October 2012 as the second single from the group's third major-label album, Uncaged. The song was written by Zac Brown, Wyatt Durrette, John Driskell Hopkins and Sonia Leigh.

Critical reception
Billy Dukes of Taste of Country gave the song four stars out of five, writing that "it’s a big, ambitious production that a group with less talent wouldn’t consider. It takes a few listens, but the song will hook you." Matt Bjorke of Roughstock gave the song a favorable review, calling it a "lyrically interesting, smart song" and "as smooth as a glass of aged single barrel southern bourbon."

Music video
The music video was directed by Wayne Isham and premiered in November 2012.

Chart performance
"Goodbye in Her Eyes" debuted at number 59 on the U.S. Billboard Hot Country Songs chart for the week of September 29, 2012. It also debuted at number 97 on the U.S. Billboard Hot 100 chart for the week of October 27, 2012. It also debuted at number 68 on the Canadian Hot 100 chart for the week of November 17, 2012. It peaked at number 1 on the US Country Airplay chart and stayed there for three weeks.

Year-end charts

Certifications

References

2012 singles
2012 songs
Zac Brown Band songs
Atlantic Records singles
Song recordings produced by Keith Stegall
Music videos directed by Wayne Isham
Country ballads
Songs written by Sonia Leigh
Songs written by John Driskell Hopkins
Songs written by Zac Brown
Songs written by Wyatt Durrette (songwriter)